YONO (You Only Need One) is an integrated digital banking platform offered by State Bank of India (SBI) to enable users to access a variety of financial and other services such as flight, train, bus and taxi bookings, online shopping, or medical bill payments.  YONO is offered as a smartphone app for both Android and iOS.

The launch of YONO had a code name project Lotus. The YONO is developed by IBM and launched in around 13 months. The cost of development was expected around  crore.

Launch
YONO was launched on 24 November 2017.

Features
YONO offers services from over 100 e-commerce companies including online shopping, travel planning, taxi booking, train booking, movie ticket booking, online education and offline retail with special discounts.  YONO also offers conventional mobile banking services such as bank account opening, fund transfers, cashless bill payments, and loans. The smartphone app can be used to make ATM withdrawals without using any ATM card through "Yono Cash" feature.

Yono Lite
Yono Lite is a mobile banking application from the State Bank of India. Earlier, it was available as "SBI Anywhere Personal" but it was rebranded as "Yono Lite" in 2018, after the introduction of YONO app. In 2021, Yono Lite saw several updates to protect its users from digital frauds.

References 

Android (operating system) software
2017 establishments in India
Mobile Banking